The Košice Self-governing Region (KSK) or the Košice Higher Territorial Unit (Slovak: Košický vyšší územný celok, KVÚC) is one of Slovakia's eight "self-governing regions" whose territory is identical with that of the administrative Košice Region.

The establishing session of the first Council of the Košice Self-governing Region was held on December 19, 2001 in the historical hall of former Župný dom (County House, today's East Slovak Gallery building) with the participation of 57 deputies elected in the first regional elections for the second level of self-government in Slovakia. Rudolf Bauer (a Christian democrat) was elected as the first president of the Košice Self-governing Region. His successor is Zdenko Trebuľa (a social democrat) elected for the president of the Košice Self-governing Region on December 10, 2005. He was inaugurated on January 9, 2006.

The seat of the Košice Self-governing Region is a former military headquarters building (generally known as The Division) on the eastern part of the Námestie Maratónu mieru (Peace Marathon Square) in Košice. It was completed in 1908 as the largest and the most modern building in the town at that time.

External links
 Official website of the Košice Self-governing Region

Košice
Regions of Slovakia
Geography of Košice Region
Self-governance

ar:أقليم كوشيتسه